Wenzhou North railway station, formerly known as Yongjia railway station, is a railway station on the Ningbo–Taizhou–Wenzhou railway located in Yongjia County, Wenzhou, Zhejiang, China.

History 
Yongjia railway station closed on 14 September 2021 for renovation. It will be renamed to Wenzhou North railway station when it reopens.

References

Railway stations in Zhejiang
Yongjia County
Buildings and structures in Wenzhou
Transport in Wenzhou